Miles Larmer is professor of African history and fellow of St Antony's College, University of Oxford.

Selected publications
 Mineworkers in Zambia: Labour and Political Change in Post-Colonial Africa. 2006. (International Library of African Studies)
 The Musakanya Papers. The Autobiographical Writings of Valentine Musakanya. 2010.
 Zambia, Mining, and Neoliberalism: Boom and Bust on the Globalized Copperbelt. 2010. (Africa Connects) (With Alastair Fraser)
 African Struggles Today: Social Movements Since Independence. 2012. (With Peter Dwyer)
 Rethinking African Politics: A History of Opposition in Zambia. 2016. (Empires and the Making of the Modern World, 1650-2000)
 The Katangese Gendarmes and War in Central Africa: Fighting Their Way Home. 2016. (With Erik Kennes)

References

External links
YouTube

Living people
Academics of Sheffield Hallam University
Fellows of St Antony's College, Oxford
British historians
Historians of Africa
Historians of colonialism
Historians of Portugal
Year of birth missing (living people)